The 1993 Salem Open-Beijing was a men's tennis tournament played on indoor carpet courts. It was the inaugural edition of the China Open, and is part of the World Series of the 1993 ATP Tour. The event was held at the Beijing International Tennis Center in Beijing, China. First-seeded The event took place from October 18 to October 24. Michael Chang won the singles title.

Finals

Singles

 Michael Chang defeated.  Greg Rusedski, 7–6(7–5), 6–7(6–8), 6–4

Doubles

 Paul Annacone /  Doug Flach defeated  Jacco Eltingh /  Paul Haarhuis, 7–6, 6–3

References

External links
 ITF tournament edition details 

China Open
1993
1993 in Chinese tennis